Members of the New South Wales Legislative Assembly  who served in the 22nd parliament of New South Wales held their seats from 1910 to 1913. They were elected at the 1910 state election on 14 October 1910. The Speakers were John Cann (15 November 1910 – 31 July 1911), Henry Willis (24 August 1911 – 22 July 1913) and Henry Morton 22 July 1913 – 22 December 1913.

See also
McGowen ministry
Results of the 1910 New South Wales state election
Candidates of the 1910 New South Wales state election

References

Members of New South Wales parliaments by term
20th-century Australian politicians